Willem de Poorter (1608–1668) was a Dutch Golden Age painter.

Biography
According to Houbraken he painted a very good Queen of Sheba, but he painted mostly still lifes. 
 
His surviving paintings today are mainly small historical allegories and still lifes with metal objects. Though he has been considered in the past by (some) 19th century historians to have been a pupil of Rembrandt, he in fact lived and worked in Haarlem, not Amsterdam. He was registered as a painter in Haarlem in 1631 and in 1634 as a member of the Haarlem Guild of St. Luke. The confusion about being a pupil of Rembrandt comes from an incorrect reading of Houbraken, who mentions him in the same paragraph along with two other painters; a painter by the last name of Van Terlee, and the much younger Willem Drost, who did live in Amsterdam as a young man, and was in fact a pupil of Rembrandt there.

De Poorter later influenced Hendrick Martensz Sorgh.

References

External links
 Works and literature on Willem de Poorter at PubHist

1608 births
1668 deaths
Dutch Golden Age painters
Dutch male painters
Artists from Haarlem
Painters from Haarlem
Pupils of Rembrandt